Magenta Skycode was an indie rock band from Turku, Finland, formed in 2005 by . Sjöroos also formed This Empty Flow and produced another Finnish pop rock band PMMP. Magenta Skycode is the name of This Empty Flow's debut album.

Albums
IIIII (2006)
Relief (2010)

EPs
Compassion (2005)
We Will Be Warm (2013)

References

External links
 

Dream pop musical groups
Finnish indie rock groups
Finnish post-punk music groups
Musical groups established in 2005
Musical groups disestablished in 2014
Musical groups from Turku